The 2012–13 season of the División de Plata de Balonmano is the 19th season of second-tier handball in Spain.

Regular season started in October 2012 and finished in late April. After completing 22 matchdays, top team is promoted to Liga ASOBAL, and teams qualified 2nd, 3rd, 4th and 5th play the promotion playoff.

As the champion team was FC Barcelona B, a reserve team, therefore unable to promote, Juanfersa Gijón was automatically promoted.

Ángel Ximénez will play in Liga ASOBAL 2013–14 by winning the promotion playoffs after defeating host team Bidasoa Irún in the final 26–28.

Promotion and relegation 
Once finished 2012–13 regular season.

Teams promoted to Liga ASOBAL 2013–14
Juanfersa Gijón – 2nd at standings
Ángel Ximénez – via playoffs
Bidasoa Irun – due to vacant seats

Teams relegated to 2013–14 Primera Nacional
None

Teams

Regular season standings

Promotion playoffs
Winner of Final will be promoted to Liga ASOBAL for 2013–14 season.
Host team: Bidasoa Irún
City: Irun and Hondarribia, Gipuzkoa
Venue: Polideportivo Hondartza and Polideportivo Artaleku
Date: 11–12 May 2013

Bracket

Semifinals

Third place

Final

Top goal scorers

References

External links
Regular season
Promotion playoffs

División de Plata de Balonmano seasons
2012–13 in Spanish handball